This is an incomplete list of currently existing shopping centers and malls in the U.S. state of Oregon.

Portland metro area

Shopping centers in the Portland metropolitan area:

Willamette Valley

Shopping centers in the Willamette Valley (excludes those in the Portland area):

Rogue Valley 
Shopping centers in the Rogue Valley:

Other areas

See also
Lists of Oregon-related topics

References

External links

Shopping malls
Oregon